The Dutch football league system consists of two fully professional leagues (Eredivisie and Eerste Divisie) and eight levels of amateur football leagues. The three highest amateur leagues, the Tweede, Derde and Vierde Divisie are semi-professional and play in nationwide leagues and the five levels below are regional leagues.

Promotion and relegation

All the leagues are connected by a promotion and relegation system, but in order to be promoted to the Eerste Divisie a club has to submit a solid business plan to be approved by the Royal Dutch Football Association, as well as meet certain stadium demands, and some other demands that the association stated for all the teams in the top two leagues.

Before 2010 there was no promotion and relegation (based on league result) between the highest amateur level (back then the Hoofdklasse) and the professional leagues. In the 2010-11 season the Topklasse was introduced as an intermediate level between the professional and amateur leagues. Promotion was optional, so it was possible that the IJsselmeervogels who won the 2010–11 Topklasse, was not promoted because they did not want to be bound to the demands for playing in the Eerste Divisie.

In 2016 the Tweede Divisie was (re)introduced between the Topklasse (renamed to Derde Divisie) and Eerste Divisie to further work on stimulating promotion and relegation between the amateur and professional leagues. However due to resistance from the amateur clubs to meet the demands for the professional leagues and worries from the professional clubs to face bankruptcy after relegation, mandatory promotion and relegation has been postponed until at least the 2022-23 season.

Men

Professional leagues
 18 teams in the Eredivisie
 20 teams (of which 4 are reserve teams of Eredivisie teams) in the Eerste Divisie. The champion of the Eerste Divisie is promoted directly to the Eredivisie, the team finishing lowest in the Eredivisie is relegated to the Eerste Divisie. the teams finishing 16th and 17th in the Eredivisie compete in promotion and relegation play-offs with 8 teams from the Eerste Divisie, in which the teams from the Eredivisie and the four best teams from the Eerste Divisie play two rounds, and the other four teams play three rounds.

Amateur leagues
The highest league is called Tweede Divisie. Until 1971, when the division was discontinued, it was comparable to the former Topklasse. The Tweede Divisie was reintroduced in 2016, decrementing the Topklasse and lower leagues by a level in the pyramid. 

 The second highest is the Derde Divisie, formerly Topklasse (Top Class). Since the 2017–18 season, 36 teams compete in the Derde Divisie, divided into Saturday and Sunday leagues, each containing 18 teams. After the season the Saturday and Sunday champions compete for the overall championship. The Derde Divisie champion promotes to the Tweede Divisie (Eerste Divisie until 2016); if they refuse promotion or don't meet necessary criteria, the runners-up will replace them. If also the runners-up refuse promotion or don't meet necessary criteria, no team is relegated from the Tweede Divisie.
 The third league is called Vierde Divisie, formerly Hoofdklasse (Main Class), which is then followed by six numbered amateur leagues. It is divided into two divisions each of Saturday and Sunday clubs, with 16 clubs in each division. 
 The next league is called Eerste Klasse, with five Saturday league divisions and six Sunday league divisions, with 14 clubs each.
 Tweede Klasse, with ten Saturday league divisions and twelve Sunday league divisions, with 14 clubs each.
 The next level, Derde Klasse, is additionally divided into regional groups. The Saturday league is divided into five regional groups with four divisions each, and the Sunday league is divided into six regional groups, again with four divisions each. Each division has between 11 and 14 clubs.
 In the Vierde Klasse, the number of divisions varies from four to nine. Again, each division contains between 11 and 14 clubs. This is the lowest amateur league in the West 2 region.
 The lowest amateur league overall, in all regions except for the West 2 region, is the Vijfde Klasse. The Saturday league has one regional group and the Sunday league is divided into the same six regions. The number of divisions varies from four to nine, with each division having between 11 and 14 clubs.
 Until 2015, Zesde Klasse had no regional groupings for the Saturday league (all teams were from the North-region), but four for the Sunday league. The number of divisions was between three and seven, with 10 to 14 clubs participating in each division.
 Until 2010, Zevende Klasse only existed in Sunday football in the North region. There was a total of three divisions, with 10 to 14 clubs participating in each division.
 Until 2001, Achtste Klasse only existed in Sunday football in the West 1 region. There was only one division.

Beginning in 2020–21, under-19 teams of professional or amateur clubs in the Tweede Divisie or higher no longer participate in the Derde Divisie, as they have been placed in the newly formed under-21 league. The new under-23 competition is for Tweede or Derde amateur clubs that are not directly eligible for under-21.

Women
Until 2007 the Hoofdklasse was the top division. From 2007 the Eredivisie was the top division until 2011 when the BeNe League was created. In 2011–12 the Topklasse was created above the Hoofklasse. Since 2015 the Eredivisie again is the top level league, as the BeNe League was ended. The Hoofdklasse plays its matches on two different days per division.

References

External links 
  League321.com - Dutch football league tables, records & statistics database. 

Netherlands